The Sunnylvsfjorden is a fjord in Stranda and Fjord in the Møre og Romsdal county of Norway. The famous Geirangerfjorden branches off to the west from the Sunnylvsfjorden.

Just south of the village of Helsem, the Storfjorden splits off into the Norddalsfjorden (to the east) and Sunnylvsfjorden (to the south). The village of Hellesylt sits at the end of this fjord. The historic Me-Åkernes farm lies on a cliff on the north side of the fjord. This former municipality of Sunnylven was centered on this fjord.

See also
 List of Norwegian fjords

References

Stranda
Fjord (municipality)
Fjords of Møre og Romsdal